Artem Obolensky (born 23 December 1975) is Russian banker and businessman.

Biography 
Artem Alekseevich Obolensky was born and raised in Kyiv. He graduated from Northumbria University in the UK in 1996, where he earned a bachelor's degree in International Accounting and Finance. In 1997, he graduated from Kyiv National Economic University, and in 2002, from the Fordham University in the United States, specializing in Economics.

Career 

The company "RusGazDobycha" (JSC), which together with PJSC "Gazprom" implements investment projects in the field of gas processing.

External links 
 http://www.gazprom.ru/press/news/2016/september/article282718/
 https://www.gazeta.ru/business/news/2017/06/30/n_10246817.shtml
 https://www.kommersant.ru/doc/4365491
 http://www.vedomosti.ru/finance/characters/2015/11/16/616929-mi-realisti
 https://www.bloomberg.com/research/stocks/private/person.asp?personId=105766321&privcapId=214519124
 http://news.europawire.eu/press-releases-tagged-with/artyom-obolensky/
 https://news.rambler.ua/other/42175261-gazprom-rassmatrivaet-tehnologiyu-nemetskoy-linde-vmesto-tehnologii-shell-po-baltiyskomu-spg/

Living people
1975 births
Russian chief executives